Classic Masters is a compilation album by Blind Melon. Classic Masters was released on January 29, 2002.

At the time of its release, Classic Masters drew some ire from the music press, most of whom quickly picked up on the differences between the Classic Masters versions and their complete album counterparts. For example, "Mouthful of Cavities" has the spoken "Listen, man. I got the window open [Do] you hear the cats, man? Listen." intro by frontman Shannon Hoon excised.

Track listing
 "Tones of Home" (from Blind Melon) – 4:27
 "Galaxie" (single edit, from Soup) – 2:41
 "Change" (from Blind Melon) – 3:42
 "Paper Scratcher" (from Blind Melon) – 3:27
 "Mouthful Of Cavities" (from Soup) – 3:22
 "Walk" (from Soup) – 2:47
 "No Rain" (from Blind Melon) – 3:38
 "Toes Across The Floor" (from Soup) – 3:05
 "Soup" (from Nico) – 3:11
 "2 X 4" (from Soup) – 4:01
 "Pull" (from Nico) – 3:27 
 "Soul One" (from Nico) – 3:14

Personnel 

Herb Agner – Project Manager
Michelle Azzopardi – Editorial Supervision
Danny Clinch – Photography
Frank Collura – A&R
Glenn Graham – Drums
Shannon Hoon – Guitar (Acoustic), Vocals
Bryan Kelley – Producer
Lee Lodyga – A&R
Ron McMaster – Remastering
Cheryl Pawelski – Producer, Compilation
Brad Smith – Bass, Vocals (background)
Terry Stevens – Guitar, Liner Notes
Christopher Thorn – Guitar
Peleg Top – Art Direction, Design
Shaun Ward – Producer

References

Blind Melon albums
2002 compilation albums
Capitol Records compilation albums